36 Draconis is a star in the northern constellation Draco. It is faintly visible to the naked eye with an apparent visual magnitude of 4.99. Based upon an annual parallax shift of 43.63 mas, it is located about 74.8 light years away. At that distance, the visual magnitude is diminished by an extinction of 0.129 due to interstellar dust. The star has a relatively high proper motion, traversing the celestial sphere at the rate of 0.353 arc seconds per year. It is moving closer to the Sun with a radial velocity of −35.6 km/s.

This is an ordinary F-type main-sequence star with a stellar classification of F5 V. It has 1.23 times the mass of the Sun and 1.64 times the Sun's radius. The star is around three billion years old and is spinning with a projected rotational velocity of 8 km/s. It is radiating 4.7 times the Sun's luminosity from its photosphere at an effective temperature of 6,638 K.

Observations carried out in 2010 and 2012 detected a faint companion at an angular separation of 3.3 arcseconds. Judging by the age and magnitude, this is a red dwarf of class M3.

References

F-type main-sequence stars
M-type main-sequence stars
Draco (constellation)
Durchmusterung objects
Draconis, 36
Gliese and GJ objects
168151
089348
6850